Fire Eater is an album by jazz saxophonist Rusty Bryant recorded for the Prestige label in 1971.

Reception

The Allmusic site awarded the album 4½ stars calling it "a session that has Bryant stretching out his meaty tone and improvisations a bit further than usual. This is respectable soul-jazz with a lot of funk, but no fusion, employing the tenor sax-organ-guitar-drums lineup".

Track listing
 "Fire Eater" (Rusty Bryant, Jeremy Taylor) - 9:30  
 "Free at Last" (Bryant, Wilbert Longmire) - 8:35  
 "The Hooker" (Leon Spencer) - 9:25  
 "Mister S." (Spencer) - 7:38

Personnel
Rusty Bryant - tenor saxophone
Bill Mason (tracks 1 & 2), Leon Spencer (tracks 3 & 4) - organ
Wilbert Longmire - guitar
Idris Muhammad - drums

Production
 Bob Porter - producer
 Rudy Van Gelder - engineer

References

Rusty Bryant albums
1971 albums
Prestige Records albums
Albums produced by Bob Porter (record producer)
Albums recorded at Van Gelder Studio